Cassidy Gray (born 25 January 2001) is a Canadian alpine skier.

Career
Gray has been part of the national team since 2021.

Gray made her World Cup debut in January 2021 with a 26th-place finish in the giant slalom event at the Kranjska Gora stop. At Gray's first World Championships in 2021, Gray finished in 23rd in the giant slalom event.

Gray designed a helmet with a Shuswap artist to honour first nations people while racing.

On January 21, 2022, Gray was named to Canada's 2022 Olympic team.

References

External links 
 

2001 births
Living people
Canadian female alpine skiers
Sportspeople from British Columbia
Alpine skiers at the 2022 Winter Olympics
Olympic alpine skiers of Canada